Kenneth Purvis MacKenzie (born March 10, 1934) is a Canadian former relief pitcher in Major League Baseball. He played with the Milwaukee Braves (1960–61), New York Mets (1962–63), St. Louis Cardinals (1963), San Francisco Giants (1964) and Houston Astros (1965).

Early life
A member of Yale's Class of 1956, MacKenzie lettered in men's hockey and baseball at Yale College. He returned to Yale as head baseball coach in 1969 and held that post for ten seasons.

Career
MacKenzie signed with the Braves in 1956 and began working his way through the club's farm system, becoming a relief specialist in 1959, his third professional baseball season.

An original Met, MacKenzie posted a 5–4 record and was the only man among 17 pitchers on the  Mets to win more games than he lost on a team which suffered 120 defeats. Manager Casey Stengel said of him: "He's a splendid young fella with a great education from Yale University. His signing with us makes him the lowest paid member of the class of Yale '56." In , MacKenzie again was the Mets' lone over-.500 pitcher, winning three of four decisions for a team which would lose 111 games. MacKenzie, however, was traded to the pennant-contending St. Louis Cardinals on August 5, 1963. MacKenzie recorded eight wins, five losses, and four saves, with a 4.96 earned run average over 76 games pitched for the Mets. Those eight victories would be his only Major League Baseball wins. 

He bounced from the Cardinals to the Giants to the Astros through the  campaign, spending time in Triple-A in the process.

All told, he won eight of 18 decisions in 129 games pitched (all but one as a reliever), with five career saves. In 208 innings pitched, he allowed 231 hits and 63 walks with 142 strikeouts.

Post-MLB Career
MacKenzie coached baseball and ice hockey at Yale between 1969-79.

References

External links

1934 births
Living people
Atlanta Crackers players
Baseball people from Ontario
Canadian expatriate baseball players in the United States
Houston Astros players
Louisville Colonels (minor league) players
Major League Baseball players from Canada
Major League Baseball pitchers
Milwaukee Braves players
New York Mets players
Oklahoma City 89ers players
St. Louis Cardinals players
San Francisco Giants players
Tacoma Giants players
Wichita Braves players
Yale Bulldogs baseball coaches
Yale Bulldogs baseball players
Yale Bulldogs men's ice hockey players